Rose Lavaud is a French football player who plays as a forward for Dijon of the Division 1 Féminine.

International career

Rose Lavaud represented France at the 2010 UEFA Women's Under-19 Championship.

References

1992 births
Dijon FCO (women) players
French women's footballers
Division 1 Féminine players
Toulouse FC (women) players
AS Saint-Étienne (women) players
FC Girondins de Bordeaux (women) players
France women's youth international footballers
Women's association football forwards
Living people